Gaya is a city in the Gaya Department of the Dosso Region of Niger. The city is situated 254 km southeast of the capital, Niamey, is located on the banks of the Niger River, and is near the borders with Benin and Nigeria.  Gaya has a population of 28,385 (2001 census).  The wettest area in Niger, Gaya averages 800 mm in rainfall a year.

There is a bridge connecting Gaya to the town of Malanville in Benin.

See also 
 Bayajidda

References

External links 
 Niger country profile

Communes of Niger
Benin–Niger border crossings
Dosso Region